Kalevi Keskstaadion is a multi-purpose stadium in Tallinn, Estonia. Opened in 1955 and having a capacity of 12,000, it is the traditional venue of the Estonian Dance Festivals and the home ground of JK Tallinna Kalev. The address of the stadium is Staadioni 8, 10132 Tallinn.

Since 1955, all of the Estonian Dance Festivals have been held there.

History 
The stadium was built during the Soviet occupation of Estonia and was opened on 12 July 1955. It was the first new large-scale sports complex built in Tallinn after World War II. The initial plans were grandiose: the first blueprints saw the stadium have a 30,000 capacity seating area and a 16,000 capacity standing area, as well as a 6 meter tall statue depicting Estonian folklore hero Kalevipoeg. However, the project was later scaled-down and saw the stadium have a capacity of 12,000. 

In 1960, Tallinna Kalev joined the Soviet Top League and in the following two years, the stadium hosted numerous high profile football matches. The match against Dynamo Moscow brought more than 20,000 people onto the stands and among the players playing was Dynamo's Lev Yashin, who won the Ballon d'Or three years after said match and is regarded by many as the greatest goalkeeper in the history of the sport. 

In 1963, the stadium hosted its first Estonian Dance Festival and has remained as the traditional venue of the celebration since. 

The 2000s saw the stadium's condition worsen to the point that in 2007, the Estonian FA declared the grass pitch unusable for top-flight football. In 2015, it was announced that Kalevi Keskstaadion will undergo a major renovation and the concept design also included a possibility to increase the capacity to 30,000 in the distant future. The renovation works began after the 2019 Estonian Dance Festival and the stadium was re-opened in 2022.

Artificial turf stadium
The sports complex of the Kalevi Keskstaadion also has an artificial turf ground named Kalevi kunstmurustaadion. Located at the southwest corner of the main stadium, the field is home to Kalev's youth system.

Gallery

References

External links

 Future design of the Kalevi Keskstaadion

Sports venues completed in 1956
1956 establishments in Estonia
Football venues in Estonia
Athletics (track and field) venues in Estonia
Multi-purpose stadiums in Estonia
Sports venues in Tallinn
Kesklinn, Tallinn